Skipton Castle is a Grade I Listed medieval castle in Skipton, North Yorkshire, England. It was built in 1090 by Robert de Romille, a Norman baron, and has been preserved for over 931 years.

History 

The castle was originally a motte and bailey castle built in 1090 by Robert de Romille, lord of the multiple estates of Bolton Abbey. Shortly after 1102 Henry I extended Romille's lands to include all of upper Wharfedale and upper Airedale. The earth and wood castle was rebuilt in stone to withstand attacks by the Scots. The cliffs behind the castle, dropping down to Eller Beck, made the castle a perfect defensive structure. The Romille line died out, and in 1310 Edward II granted the castle to Robert Clifford who was appointed Lord Clifford of Skipton and Guardian of Craven. Robert Clifford ordered many improvements to the fortifications, but died in the Battle of Bannockburn in 1314 when the improvements were barely complete. Skipton was raided by the Scots during The Great Raid of 1322, yet the castle, with all its improvements, withstood the attack.

During the English Civil War the castle was the only Royalist stronghold in the north of England until December 1645. After a three-year siege, a surrender was negotiated in 1645 between Oliver Cromwell and the Royalists. Cromwell slighted the castle by ordering the removal of the roofs. Legend has it that during the siege, sheep fleeces were hung over the walls to deaden the impact from the rounds of cannon fire. Sheep fleeces feature in the town's coat of arms. Skipton remained the Cliffords' principal seat until 1676. Lady Anne Clifford (1590–1676) was the last Clifford to own it. After the siege, she ordered repairs and she planted a yew tree in the central courtyard to commemorate its repair after the war. Lady Anne's daughter, Lady Margaret Sackville (1614–1676), married John Tufton, 2nd Earl of Thanet (1609–1664) and the castle was then passed down through the Tufton family, becoming the seat of Lord Hothfield in 1871.

Today Skipton Castle is a well-preserved medieval castle and is a tourist attraction and private residence. The castle is the start of the  Lady Anne's Way long-distance path to Penrith.

Further Reginaldus Flandrensis witnessed a Skipton charter around 1130. "He held an office of trust as Seneschal of Skipton Castle, and we must assume that these lands were given to him at about that time as a reward for his services. They amounted to 1 Knight's fee and 14 carucates, and were held under Skipton Castle for feudal service."

Layout 
The castle has six drum towers, with a domestic range connecting two towers on the northern side, protected by a precipice overlooking the Eller Beck. The first floor comprises the original kitchen, great hall, withdrawing rooms and the lord's bedchamber. New kitchens, storage and work cellars make up the ground floor. The remaining towers are military in nature and purpose. In the 16th and 17th centuries were added a new entrance staircase (replacing the original drawbridge), a further domestic wing, and larger windows in the original structure. The roof is fully intact. In the centre is a Tudor courtyard, the Conduit Court, which contains a yew tree, reputedly planted by Lady Anne in 1659.

The outer curtain wall encloses the inner wards and subsidiary buildings, including the ruins of a 12th-century chapel. The wall is mainly extant, and is pierced by a twin-towered Norman gatehouse. The east tower of the gatehouse contains a 17th-century shell grotto, one of two remaining grottos from this period. (The other is at Woburn Abbey.)

An ancient well may explain how the castle garrison survived the siege of 1643–1645.

Burials 
Henry Clifford, 2nd Earl of Cumberland, in the family vault
George Clifford, 3rd Earl of Cumberland, in the family vault

See also 
 History of Skipton

References

Further reading
 Skipton Castle (guidebook), Jarrod Publishing, 1999

External links 

 Official site
 Gatehouse Gazetteer record for Skipton Castle, containing a comprehensive bibliography
 Skipton Web entry on Skipton Castle

Buildings and structures completed in 1090
Castles in North Yorkshire
Grade I listed buildings in North Yorkshire
Grade I listed castles
Historic house museums in North Yorkshire
Tourist attractions in North Yorkshire
Shell grottoes
Skipton